, was the second head of the Yamashina-no-miya, a collateral line of the Japanese imperial family.

Early life
Prince Yamashina Kikumaro was the son of Prince Yamashina Akira. His mother was a concubine, Nakajo Chieko, but as Prince Akira had no children by his official wife, Princess Katsura Sumiko (the half-sister of Emperor Kōmei), Kikumaro was adopted as his official heir.

However, in 1880, he was adopted by Prince Nashimoto Moriosa to carry on the Nashimoto line. However, following Prince Moriosa's death, the Nashimoto line passed to Prince Kuni Morimasa, and Prince Kikumaro was able to return as heir to the Yamashina line. On 2nd February 1898, he succeeded his father as the second head of the Yamashina-no-miya house.

Military career
Prince Yamashina Kikumaro attended the Imperial Japanese Naval Academy and received a commission as a sub-lieutenant in 1894. He served in combat with distinction during the Russo-Japanese War of 1904–1905, and was awarded the Order of the Golden Kite (4th class). By 1905, he was promoted to the rank of captain. He entered the Naval Staff College in January 1908, but died suddenly four months later at the young age of 34.

Marriage & Family
On 14 September 1895, Prince Yamashina Kikumaro married Kujo Noriko (4 December 1878 – 11 November 1901), a daughter of Prince Kujō Michitaka. Prince and Princess Yamashina had two sons and a daughter:

 Prince Yamashina Takehiko (13 February 1898 – 10 August 1987)
 Marquis Yamashina Yoshimaro (5 July 1900 – 29 January 1989)
 Princess Yamashina Yasuko (31 October 1901 – 29 December 1974)

On 2 February 1902, the widowed Prince Yamashina married Shimazu Hisako (7 February 1874 – 26 February 1938), daughter of Prince Shimazu Tadayoshi. Prince Yamashina and his second wife had three sons:

 Marquis Fujimaro Tsukuba (b. 7 February 1905 – 20 March 1978)
 Count Hagimaro Kashima (21 April 1906 – 26 August 1932)
 Count Shigemaro Katsuragi (29 April 1908 – 10 January 1947)

Gallery

References
 Keene, Donald. Emperor of Japan: Meiji and His World, 1852–1912 (New York: Columbia University Press, 2002) 
 Lebra, Takie Sugiyama. Above the Clouds: Status Culture of the Modern Japanese Nobility (Berkeley: University of California Press, 1993) 
 Papinot Edmond. Historical and geographical dictionary of Japan (New York: F. Ungar Pub. Co., 1948)
 Nishida Imperial Japanese Navy

1873 births
1908 deaths
Japanese princes
Imperial Japanese Navy officers
Nashimoto-no-miya
Yamashina-no-miya
People from Kyoto
People of Meiji-period Japan
Japanese military personnel of the Russo-Japanese War
Recipients of the Order of the Golden Kite